Mephisto is a fictional character appearing in American comic books published by Marvel Comics. The character first appeared in Silver Surfer #3 (December 1968), and was created by Stan Lee and John Buscema and based on Mephistopheles – a demon character from the Faust legend, who has sometimes been referred to as Mephisto. Introduced as a recurring adversary of the Silver Surfer and Johnny Blaze, the second incarnation of the Ghost Rider, Mephisto has also endured as one of Spider-Man's most prominent adversaries, being responsible for Norman and Harry Osborn's respective transformations into the Green Goblin and Kindred; and for the superhero's loss of his marriage to Mary-Jane Watson, considering their future daughter Spider-Girl his archenemy. Mephisto has often come into conflict with Doctor Strange, Doctor Doom, Scarlet Witch and other heroes of the Marvel Universe, being responsible both for the creation of the Cosmic Ghost Rider and the descents of Phil Coulson and Otto Octavius into villainy.

Debuting in the Silver Age of comic books, the character has appeared in over five decades of Marvel continuity. The character has also appeared in associated Marvel merchandise, including animated television series, feature film, toys, trading cards, and video games.

Mephisto has been described as one of Marvel's most notable and powerful supervillains.

The character was portrayed by Peter Fonda in the 2007 film Ghost Rider, and Ciaran Hinds in its 2012 sequel Ghost Rider: Spirit of Vengeance.

Publication history
Inspired by Mephistopheles of the Faust legend, he was introduced into Marvel comics by writer Stan Lee and penciler John Buscema, Mephisto debuted in Silver Surfer #3 (cover dated Dec. 1968), and was established as a perennial foe for the cosmic hero, also appearing in Silver Surfer #8–9 (Sept.–Oct. 1969) and 16–17 (May – June 1970).

Author Mike Conroy has described Mephisto as "the tempter who could offer the endlessly soul-tormented Silver Surfer the world, even dangling the Surfer's off-limits long-distance lover in front of him. As always the case with Lee's heroes, the Surfer's goodness and nobility won out, but Mephisto was only stymied, not defeated, and the pattern was set."

Mephisto went on to become a foe for the Norse god Thor in Thor #180–181 (Sept. – Oct. 1970), Astonishing Tales #8 (Oct. 1971) and Thor #204–205 (Oct. – Nov. 1972). He was later revealed to be the being to whom Johnny Blaze had sold his soul to and thus had been cursed to become the Ghost Rider, in a retcon that placed him in the role originally played by Satan. This was later retconned back to Satan, though Mephisto's influence is still felt in the 1990s by the Danny Ketch Ghost Rider.

Other appearances included posing as Satan in Marvel Spotlight #5 (Aug. 1972); tormenting the titular superhero team in Fantastic Four #155–157 (Feb. – April 1975) and Thor #310 (Aug. 1981) and 325 (Nov. 1982). Mephisto also guest-starred in two miniseries: The Vision and the Scarlet Witch (vol. 2) #1–12 (Oct. 1985 – Sept. 1986) and Secret Wars II #1-9 (July 1985 – March 1986), before starring in the self-titled miniseries Mephisto vs. #1–4 (April – July 1987), battling four of Marvel's super-teams. The miniseries was penciled by co-creator Buscema.

In Daredevil #266 (May 1989), penciler John Romita, Jr. redesigned the character, re-imagining him as a bloated, naked creature with short, vaguely frog-like legs and a demonic-looking head. Romita explained, "I couldn’t see the Devil with tights and a cape." Subsequent portrayals have varied between Mephisto's original appearance and the Romita redesign.

Mephisto continued to torment the Scarlet Witch in Avengers West Coast #51–52 (Nov. – Dec. 1989); created a new adversary for the Marvel heroes in Daredevil #270 (Sept. 1989); and appeared in Marvel Graphic Novel No. 49 -  Doctor Strange and Doctor Doom: Triumph and Torment (1989). Additionally, he was featured prominently in the One More Day story line in The Amazing Spider-Man #544; Friendly Neighborhood Spider-Man #24; The Sensational Spider-Man (vol. 2) #41 and The Amazing Spider-Man #545 (Oct. 2007–Jan. 2008).

In 2009, Mephisto was ranked #48 on IGN's list of Greatest Comic Book Villains of All Time.

Fictional character biography

Introduction (1960s–1970s)
Mephisto is a perennial villain in the Marvel Universe, and is responsible for a number of evil acts, including capturing and holding the soul of Cynthia von Doom – the mother of Doctor Doom — until Doctor Strange and Doom freed her so she could ascend into Heaven. He was jealous of the worship of the fire demon Zarathos, so, posing as Satan, Mephisto creates the Ghost Rider by bonding Zarathos to Johnny Blaze. Mephisto refers to his domain as Hell. In one story where he battled Thor, he was shown to have various historical villains in his realm, such as Adolf Hitler, Blackbeard, and Attila the Hun.

Mephisto claims to have been created, along with many other demons, by the supreme being whose suicide resulted in the creation of the Marvel Universe, as well as the Infinity Gems. He also claimed that his totally evil nature is because the supreme being did not choose to make him good, as that being had no concept of it. He witnessed the Celestial known as the Progenitor succumbing to the Horde on Earth, with Mephisto, still young in the form of a fly, taking this opportunity to give birth to his maggots.

Secret Wars II, 1980s and The Infinity Gauntlet
In Secret Wars II, Mephisto seeks to steal the Beyonder's powers or to destroy him to win the favor of Death. Mephisto sends an army of supervillains called the Legion Accursed to attack the Beyonder, who is saved by the Thing. After the Legion Accursed was defeated, Mephisto returned its members to where they were before he formed the group.

Mephisto later creates his "son", Blackheart, a demonic entity that plagues many of Earth's heroes. Mephisto later manipulates the sorcerer Master Pandemonium into gathering the five scattered fragments of his soul that were lost in an ill-fated encounter with the aforementioned Franklin Richards. When the Scarlet Witch attempts to use magic to conceive children with her husband, the android Vision, she unknowingly summons two of Pandemonium's soul fragments, which are born as her infant twins. The revelation of her children's origin, followed by their loss when they are reabsorbed into him, drives the Scarlet Witch insane.

Mephisto also tries to destroy the Avenger Hawkeye when he enters Hell to try to save the soul of his deceased wife, Mockingbird.

Mephisto acted as a servant of the mad Titan Thanos during the "Infinity Wars", seeking to attain power for himself.

Alongside the Grim Reaper, Blackheart brings Wonder Man to Mephisto's realm to battle Mephisto.

In a series of confrontations that also involve the Ghost Rider, the Punisher and the Wolverine, Blackheart kills Mephisto and takes over his portion of Hell. Mephisto survives, although as more of a ghostly apparition (claiming he had been denied a place in both Heaven and Hell), and for a time tricks the Silver Surfer into believing he was dead so as to collect his soul and thus perhaps regain his former power, but the Surfer refutes him and, with his allies, defeats Mephisto, resulting in his spirit form being seemingly destroyed.

Mephisto again survives death and soon finds himself with access to another universe: the Earth of the Top Cow universe. Seeking to torment an entirely new world of superheroes, he plots to enter this world and remake it for his own dark desires. But Eternity senses this cosmic disruption and sends several heroes (Jennifer Kale, the Wolverine, the Ghost Rider, the Silver Surfer and Elektra) to that universe to aid a group of Top Cow heroes (Witchblade, Weapon Zero, Cyblade and Ballistic) to combat and ultimately defeat Mephisto. However, his resulting banishment back to Earth-616 seemed to restore him as a tangible physical threat, though without his elevated place of Hellish power, and he would torment heroes for some years to come, like Nighthawk, the Black Panther, the Slingers, the Hellcat and Magik.

2000s

One More Day
Mephisto heals May Parker in exchange for changing the personal timelines of Peter Parker (Spider-Man) and Mary Jane Watson so that they never married, claiming he did so only because he hated their happiness (also adding that he has no interest in taking Spider-Man's soul because such a deal would result in him tormenting a soul that is willing to accept the punishment because its sacrifice saved another, a righteousness which disgusts him). He also, at Mary Jane's request, erases all knowledge of Peter's secret identity, both learning only at the point of their memories being erased that their future daughter will be erased as well. During the process, Harry Osborn is also brought back to life; the alteration of the timeline retcons the details of Harry's death being faked by his father.

2010s

"Siege"

Mephisto had bartered part of his realm to the Asgardian death goddess Hela for 1,001 years in exchange for control for 101 days of the 13 surviving Dísir, dangerous evil predecessors to the Valkyries that were created by Odin's father Bor. This troubles the minions who had previously lived in this territory, and part of Siege Aftermath shows the "last stand of the perfidious diaspora" in what seems to have been a revolt. The revolt is quickly put down by the Dísir under Mephisto's command. The Dísir leader Brün tries to negotiate with Mephisto because she wishes to invade Hela's realm of Hel and feast on the souls of the Asgardian dead. Mephisto tells her that he has no interest in Hel, but he does not object to their invasion. Thor, trying to defend Hel and its dead, enters Mephisto's domain to find the Eir-gram, a magical sword that can cut the otherwise insubstantial Dísir. Mephisto offers to give him the Eir-Gram and a "happily ever after" for Asgard if he agrees not to interfere with one of Mephisto's plans, which is not at that time named. Thor remains silent the whole time. Mephisto grants him entry to Hell, but Thor must survive many difficulties before he finds the blade.

"Fear Itself"

Mephisto appears before a de-powered Johnny Blaze during the attack by Sin in the form of Skadi and states that he has damned the human race. Mephisto then states that he will help Johnny save the human race from the Serpent and the Worthy. Mephisto goes on a date with New Mutants member Magma; apparently confiding in her, he explains that, while he is the embodiment of one of the great forces of the universe, the force that created him also gave him desires and emotions, and he occasionally wants to do things that humans do. Magma later confided to Blink that she has subsequently seen Mephisto again, but wishes to keep it secret. After speaking with the Gods at the Infinite Embassy, Mephisto headed to the Devil's Advocacy to speak with the other demons about the Serpent's threat on Earth.

Mephisto briefly appears to assist Deadpool in destroying one of his demon lieutenants, before taking a major part in the Hell on Earth War, where he is defeated and replaced by X-Factor member Strong Guy as ruler of Hell.

Remaining era
When the Thunderbolts were accidentally transported to Hell, Mephisto took the opportunity to give them a way out if they defeated Strong Guy. The Red Hulk convinced Strong Guy to abandon the position of Hell-lord and try to regain his lost soul, allowing Mephisto to regain the throne of Hell and let the Thunderbolts return to Earth.

The New Multiverse
Mephisto is revealed to have assumed the form of the Maker to try to prevent Victor von Doom from redeeming his soul.

"Damnation"
Mephisto finds out that Doctor Strange has restored the lives of the Las Vegas citizens that were killed during when HYDRA bombed an attack during the organization's takeover of the United States. He orchestrates events that cause his demons to bring Doctor Strange to his recently created Hotel Inferno. Mephisto claims that the remnants of Las Vegas were in his realm before it was restored. Hotel Inferno starts to have an effect on the people of Las Vegas. It also had an effect on the Black Panther, Captain Marvel, the Falcon, Hawkeye, and Jane Foster's Thor form where they were all turned into Ghost Rider-like creatures. As Hotel Inferno starts to affect the people of Las Vegas, Doctor Strange fought Mephisto in a game of blackjack. The deal is that Mephisto had to return the souls to Las Vegas if Doctor Strange won and that Doctor Strange's soul would be claimed by Mephisto if Mephisto won. Though Doctor Strange won by cheating, Mephisto found out and had Doctor Strange tortured. Mephisto then turns Doctor Strange into a Ghost Rider-like creature. After Mephisto removes the Ghost Rider from Johnny Blaze, he throws Blaze from the roof. Mephisto appeared on the battlefield and gloated on them, sending Johnny Blaze to attack him. Just then, the possessed Avengers attack Mephisto, as Wong revealed that Mephisto rendering his throne vacant has enabled the Ghost Rider to become the new ruler of Mephisto's realm. After Doctor Strange returned from the Realm Between, he assisted the Midnight Sons and the Avengers in preventing Mephisto from returning to his realm to reclaim his throne. Though Doctor Strange defeated him, Mephisto fled back to his realm where he was defeated by Johnny Blaze and the different Ghost Riders from across the Multiverse. After Johnny Blaze sent Mephisto back to Earth, he was kept at the top of Hotel Inferno in countless restraints as Hotel Inferno remained on Earth. As Doctor Strange, the Avengers, and the Midnight Sons left upon Las Vegas returning to normal, Wong remained behind to keep an eye on Hotel Inferno's casino.

In an alternate future where Thanos conquered the universe, Frank Castle signs a demonic deal with Mephisto to become a Ghost Rider, becoming known as the Cosmic Ghost Rider after being bestowed with the Power Cosmic by Galactus, before coming to serve Thanos after spending countless years on a lifeless Earth after Mephisto's eventual silence, and going insane. After Thanos has the Cosmic Ghost Rider drag his past self to the future to kill him, the past Thanos, upon returning to the present, beats up Mephisto and tells him to stay away from Castle, confusing Mephisto and as such bringing Castle to his attention; Mephisto is subsequently beaten up by Gwen Poole and Squirrel Girl.

Doctor Strange later spoke to Mephisto about removing the One Below All's possession from the Hulk after the brief Defenders reunion. Mephisto states that the One Below All is far stronger than he is. Miles Morales later makes a deal with Mephisto to reverse time and resurrect Viv Vision and Kamala Khan, unknowingly at the cost of the death of a woman Miles had earlier saved.

"War of the Realms"

A flashback revealed that Mephisto came into contact with the Power Elite at some point and helped them out by creating simulacrums that the Power Elite programmed to become the Squadron Supreme of America. This group is used by a somehow-revived Phil Coulson to become the sanctioned superhero team for the United States.

Spider-Geddons aftermath

When the Spider-Man of Earth-44145 threatens the life of James Martin, the Superior Spider-Man (Doctor Octopus' mind in the Proto-Clone) uses a signal move he learned from Doctor Strange to call Mephisto, who states that the Spider-Man of Earth-44145 is out of his jurisdiction. The Superior Spider-Man asks Mephisto to restore him to the man he once was for a day so that he can fight the Spider-Man of Earth-44145. While Mephisto states that he either has or does not have his soul, he does have a counteroffer that will restore his body without disease (physical and mental) and the taint of Peter Parker. As the Superior Spider-Man tells Anna Maria Marconi that there is no other option, he expects Mephisto to uphold his end of the bargain.

2020s

"Heroes Reborn"

After being killed by Deadpool and going to Hell after his death for unspecified war crimes, Phil Coulson makes a deal with Mephisto to be restored to life in exchange for his fealty, with Mephisto creating simulacrums of the Squadron Supreme of America for him to control as a United States-sponsored superhero team. Coulson later wines with Mephisto while discussing his own plans to destroy the Avengers. After acquiring the Pandemonium Cube, Coulson uses it to rewrite reality in Mephisto's name, erasing the Avengers from existence and making himself the President of the United States. After his role in the reality change is discovered and he is defeated by his former idol Captain America, Coulson is imprisoned in the Pandemonium Cube by Mephisto as punishment and brought before a collection of Mephisto's counterparts from 615 other universes, with whom Mephisto proposes forming a "Council of Red" for multiversal conquest.

"Sinister War"

Doctor Strange later visited Mephisto at the Hotel Inferno asking about what was wrong with Peter Parker's soul as well as how Harry Osborn was seemingly revived as Kindred. It was during this confrontation that Mephisto confesses his true motivations for erasing the marriage of the Parkers, as at some undisclosed point in the future he finally seizes control of Earth, only for his reign to be ended by either Spider-Man or his daughter. Striking a deal with Peter to affect his soul and erasing both his marriage with Mary Jane and their daughter was Mephisto's way of ensuring that that future would never come to pass in either scenario. Mephisto is also revealed as the one responsible for the torment and creation of the Kindred Twins (the souls of Sarah and Gabriel, clones previously created by a temporarily insane Harry when he was alive and a posthumous A.I. of him to pose as the children of his father and Gwen Stacy, merged with the A.I. in physical demonic forms) as part of his long game waged against Peter Parker and the Osborn family, as well for Norman Osborn's initial transformations into the Green Goblin, having long ago made a deal with him in exchange for Harry's soul. Doctor Strange then strikes a deal with Mephisto to have Harry's soul returned to the body of his clone as the clone is dying, alongside the Kindred Twins.

Using the Multiversal Masters of Evil
At the time when a version of Doctor Doom named Doom Supreme watched the Prehistoric Avengers send Kid Thanos back to his own time, Mephisto approached Doom Supreme and suggested to him that he put together a team that would defeat any team of Avengers. Doom Supreme took Mephisto's offer and formed a Multiversal version of the Masters of Evil consisting of a version of Kid Thanos, a version of Dark Phoenix and her pet Berserkers, a version of Erik Killmonger called King Killmonger, a version of the Green Goblin with Ghost Rider-like powers called the Ghost Goblin, and the Black Skull. Due to their agreement with the Council of Reds, they had to save Earth-616 for last. After each of the attacks from the Multiversal Masters of Evil, Doom Supreme and Kid Thanos meet up with the Iron Inquisitor and Mephisto in the form of a dog as he nears the corpse of the Orb. Under Mephisto's orders, Doom Supreme unburns Uatu's eye fragment and puts it in his own eye. As Doom Supreme and Kid Thanos enter a portal to meet with their teammates and get back to work, Mephisto and the Iron Inquisitor talk about what to do with the Multiversal Masters of Evil as Mephisto's dog form eats at the fragments of Uatu's eye. Then he has the Orb's corpse dumped into the ocean.

The Serpent Society later performed a ritual to summon the "serpent" that they worshiped by taking some lives of the people in Serpent Solutions' old headquarters. When the Avengers arrive and found that Nighthawk defeated them, the portal that formed during the ritual summons Mephisto's dog form, as it was mentioned by Nighthawk that the serpent was one of Mephisto's forms. Before assuming his true form and retreating, Mephisto makes the Council of Reds known to the Avengers.

In the distant past, Mephisto encounters Avenger Prime who states that he came to watch Mephisto lose. They watch as the Avengers arrive and confront the Prehistoric Avengers. As both Avengers fight, Avenger Prime goes on the offensive against Mephisto as Mephisto summons the Council of Reds to help subdue him. The Council of Reds begin their attack on the Avengers Tower in the God Quarry as the Ghost Rider's Hell Charger drives into some of them. After the Council of Reds have been decimated by the Multiversal Avengers with help from Old Man Phoenix and the Granddaughters of King Thor, Captain Marvel, Nighthawk, and Thor of Earth-56377 find a smaller version of Mephisto who is the last of the Council of Reds. Just then, Mephisto appears and absorbs his variant as he appears in gigantic size, claiming that the Council of Reds had served their purpose. He then quotes "Welcome, Avengers, to the end of everything". As Mephisto returns to Earth-616 during prehistoric times, a recuperated Kid Thanos informs him that Ghost Goblin and King Killmonger are dead, Black Skull was stripped of his Symbiote, and Doom Supreme and Dark Phoenix have fled. As Kid Thanos is shown with the corpses of Ghost Goblin, Hound, and King Killmonger as well as the unconscious body of Red Skull, Kid Thanos states that he can obtain the fresh knowledge of his fallen teammates on his dissection table as Mephisto states that Black Skull isn't dead yet. When Kid Thanos states that it's a bad idea to take on the Avengers by himself, Mephisto enters a portal as he quotes "Taking on the Avengers myself. Heh. That's a fine idea". Arriving in the God Quarry, the Council of Red tell Mephisto that they are displeased with his actions and how their teammates fell to the Multiversal Avengers. Mephisto proceeds to kill the remaining Council of Red members and absorb them into his body. After defeating Captain Marvel, Nighthawk, and Thor of Earth-56377, a Celestial-sized Mephisto is spotted by Ant-Man of Earth-818 as Mephisto destroys the Carol Corps' Omni-Carrier causing Ant-Man of Earth-818 to inform Avenger Prime of what happened. Reinforcements come in the form of Ka-Zar, an alternate Galactus from the reality that Iron Inquisitor sent Ka-Zar from, Gorilla-Man, Ursa Major, and the Progenitor which was modified with Deathlok technology.

Powers and abilities
Mephisto is an extremely powerful immortal demonic entity possessing abilities used by manipulating the forces of magic. Mephisto can employ his power for a variety of uses, including superhuman physical attributes, shape and sizeshifting, projecting illusions, manipulating memories, and altering time and reality. He is also highly resistant to injury. With his regenerative healing factor, Mephisto has the ability to recover quickly.

The character has been shown to be energized by sources of evil in the human realm, such as the alien Dire Wraiths. Like other demons, Mephisto is symbiotically linked to, and considerably more powerful within, his own realm, and the character is able to transform the structure at will. Within it he has threatened a galaxy and stalemated a nourished Galactus until the latter threatened to consume his realm. If Mephisto's physical form is destroyed, the character will regenerate and reform in his domain. Mephisto is known for acquiring souls, but cannot subjugate the will of another being without the victim's permission, which is usually done with some form of pact.

Cultural impact and legacy

Critical reception
George Marston of Newsarama stated, "Mephisto may be one of Marvel's most iconic, enduring villains - and that's no surprise considering he's based on the archetype of the Christian devil, pretty much the most iconic 'villain' in religion, folklore, and in some cases, even as a metaphorical force in world history. Marvel's comic book take on the concept of an omnipotent, omniscient infernal manipulator who rules over his own realm of eternal punishment through treachery and torture has had a similar impact on the history of the Marvel Universe. Marc Buxton of Den of Geek called Mephisto one of the "greatest monstrous creations that ever sprang from the nightmares of the House of Ideas," writing, "You can’t very well have a list of the most nefarious Marvel monsters without listing the devil, hisownself. Not really the Biblical devil, Mephisto is a netherworldly tempter, a soul broker, and a liar who pretty much serves the same exact purpose as the Devil but he won’t get Marvel in trouble with Christian conservatives. Mephisto first battled the Silver Surfer in the Silver Age (HEY!) and has bedeviled (hiYO) just about every Marvel hero. He recently pissed off fandom by cutting a Faustian deal with Peter Parker and erasing Spidey’s marriage. Mephisto was a key figure in The Infinity Gauntlet, constantly whispering Iago like in Thanos’ ear and is the very symbol of corruption in the Marvel Universe."

Accolades
 In 2014, IGN ranked Mephisto 48th in their "Top 100 Comic Book Vilains" list.
 In 2015, Den of Geek ranked Mephisto 13th in their "Marvel’s 31 Best Monsters" list.
 In 2017, Den of Geek ranked Mephisto 14th in their "Guardians of the Galaxy 3: 50 Marvel Characters We Want to See" list.
 In 2018, CinemaBlend included Mephisto in their "5 Marvel Villains We'd Love To See In Black Panther 2" list.
 In 2020, CBR.com ranked Mephisto 2nd in their "10 Most Powerful Comic Book Villains With Demonic Origins" list.
 In 2020, CBR.com ranked Mephisto 3rd in their "Marvel: Dark Spider-Man Villains, Ranked From Lamest To Coolest" list.
 In 2021, Screen Rant ranked Mephisto 4th in their "Mephisto & Every Other Marvel Comic Demon, Ranked By Power" list.
 In 2021, CBR.com ranked Mephisto 2nd in their "Marvel: 10 Strongest Demons In The Franchise" list.
 In 2021, Looper ranked Mephisto 4th in their "Strongest Supervillains In History" list.
 In 2022, Screen Rant ranked Mephisto 2nd in their "10 Most Powerful Marvel Comics Horror Characters" list, 4h in their "10 Most Powerful X-Men Villains In Marvel Comics" list and included him in their "10 Most Powerful Wonder Man Villains In Marvel Comics" list.
 In 2022, CBR.com ranked Mephisto 4th in their "Wonder Man's 10 Greatest Enemies" list and 6th in their "Marvel's 10 Scariest Monsters" list.

Other versions

Guardians of the Galaxy
In the Guardians' 31st century timeline, he has a daughter named Malevolence.

Universe X
In the Earth X sequel, Universe X, Mephisto is the force behind Pope Immortus (secretly Kang) and his extermination of Reed Richards' Human Torch to assume mutant dominance. It was later revealed that in that reality, Mephisto is not the devil, but the first mutant to exist, where he is shaped by mankind's fear.

Ultimate Marvel
Mephisto (as Satan) appeared in Ultimate Comics: Avengers as the man Johnny Blaze sold his soul to avenge his love Roxanne, and to punish the guilty as a "bounty hunter for Hell."

Marvel Mangaverse
The demonic Mephisto created Galactus in Marvel Mangaverse.

Marvel Zombies: Halloween
Mephisto appears in Marvel Zombies: Halloween, saving Kitty Pryde and her son, Peter, from a zombified Darkhawk, Alex Power, Squirrel Girl, Karolina Dean, and Mettle, to claim Kitty and Peter's souls for later.

In other media

Television

 An illusion of Mephisto created by Mastermind makes a cameo appearance in the Spider-Man and His Amazing Friends episode "The Prison Plot".
 Mephisto was due to appear in the proposed second season of Silver Surfer (1998), with his demonic nature toned down and made acceptable for children. Despite the series' cancellation, he makes a cameo at the end of the first season episode "Down to Earth Part 3".

Film
 Mephisto, as Mephistopheles, appears in Ghost Rider, portrayed by Peter Fonda. This version primarily appears in a human form, with glimpses of his true goat-like demonic form appearing throughout the film, and employs a Ghost Rider as a bounty hunter. Prior to the film's events, he turned Carter Slade into his Ghost Rider in the 1800s to retrieve the Contract of San Venganza, but Slade betrayed Mephistopheles. In 1986, Johnny Blaze makes a deal with Mephistopheles to save the former's father from cancer in return for serving the devil at a future date, only for Blaze's father to die in an accident the next day. In the present, Mephistopheles transforms Blaze into his latest Ghost Rider to hunt down his traitorous son Blackheart before the demon can find the contract. After receiving help from Slade, Blaze defeats Blackheart and defies Mephistopheles by keeping his Ghost Rider powers instead of returning them, despite being offered by Mephistopheles to have them removed.
 Mephistopheles, as the devil, appears in Ghost Rider: Spirit of Vengeance. He takes the form of a man named Roarke (portrayed by Ciarán Hinds) and fathers a son with a woman named Nadya after saving her life. Employing Nadya's mercenary ex-boyfriend Ray Carrigan, Roarke intends to use the boy, Danny, as his host and gain full access to his powers on Earth instead of relying on bodies that rapidly decay. However, Blaze defeats Carrigan and protects the boy, who in turn boosts Blaze's powers so he can send the devil back to Hell.

Video games
 Mephisto appears as a boss in Silver Surfer (1990).
 Mephisto appears as an alternate skin for Blackheart in Marvel Super Heroes vs. Street Fighter.
 Mephisto's voice is heard in a bonus mission in Fantastic Four.
 Mephisto appears as a boss in Marvel: Ultimate Alliance voiced by Fred Tatasciore.
 Mephisto appears in the Ghost Rider film tie-in game, voiced by Kirk Thornton.
 Mephisto appears in Morrigan Aensland's ending for Marvel vs. Capcom 3: Fate of Two Worlds.
 Mephisto appears in Ghost Rider and Dante's endings in Ultimate Marvel vs. Capcom 3. In the former ending, Dante and Trish attempt to force Mephisto to undo his demonic pact with Johnny Blaze. In the latter ending, Mephisto attempts to coax Dante into forming a pact with him, only for the Devil Hunter to force Mephisto to send him after Blackheart instead.
 Mephisto appears as a boss in Marvel: Avengers Alliance.
 Mephisto appears as a playable character in Marvel: Contest of Champions.
 Mephisto appears as a playable character and boss in Marvel: Future Fight.
 Mephisto appears as a boss in Marvel Future Revolution.
 Mephisto appears in Marvel's Midnight Suns, voiced by Jason Isaacs.

References

External links
 Mephisto at Marvel.com
 Mephisto at Marvel Directory
 
 

Characters created by John Buscema
Characters created by Stan Lee
Comics characters introduced in 1968
Fictional characters who break the fourth wall
Fictional characters who can change size
Fictional characters who can manipulate reality
Fictional characters who can manipulate time
Fictional characters with immortality
Fictional flies
Fictional impostors
Fictional soul collectors
Marvel Comics characters who are shapeshifters
Marvel Comics characters who can teleport
Marvel Comics characters who have mental powers
Marvel Comics characters who use magic
Marvel Comics characters with accelerated healing
Marvel Comics characters with superhuman strength
Marvel Comics demons
Marvel Comics devils
Marvel Comics film characters
Marvel Comics male supervillains
Marvel Comics supervillains
Mythology in Marvel Comics
Spider-Man characters